Morgan County Schools is the operating school district within Morgan County, West Virginia. It is governed by the Morgan County Board of Education.

Schools

High schools
Berkeley Springs High School 
Paw Paw High School

Middle schools
Warm Springs Middle School

Intermediate schools
Warm Springs Intermediate School

Elementary schools
Paw Paw Elementary School 
Pleasant View Elementary School]] 
Widmyer Elementary School

Schools no longer in operation
Great Cacapon Elementary School
Greenwood Elementary School 
Magnolia School
North Berkeley Primary School

External links

Morgan County Schools

School districts in West Virginia